Ornice is a village in the Gospić municipality in the Lika region of central Croatia, Lika-Senj County. It is located near Gospić, connected by the D25 highway. The 2011 census registered 6 residents.

Demographics

NOTE: The 1857-1880 population data is included in the population data for Divoselo.

Notable natives and residents

References

Populated places in Lika-Senj County